Gobiomorphus australis, the striped gudgeon, is a fish in the family Eleotridae, native to eastern Australia. It can be found in a wide variety of habitats from clear streams with rapid currents to muddy stillwaters such as ponds and waterholes. Juveniles are common in estuaries near rocks, submerged logs and among vegetation. They are good climbers and are able to clamber over wet rocky surfaces such as rapids and waterfalls. 

G. australis is a carnivorous species which preys on a wide range of prey including aquatic insects, molluscs and crustaceans. The spawn in the late austral summer when the water reaches 21°C. The eggs are laid in one uniform, compactlayer on the solid surfaces of rocks and logs, or similar. The male guards and keeps the water moving over the nest by fanning until the larvae hatch after around four days. The larvae are free-swimming and are taken downstream by the current into estuaries.

References

External links
 Fishes of Australia : Gobiomorphus australis

Gobiomorphus
Freshwater fish of Australia
Fish described in 1864
Taxa named by Gerard Krefft